The 1977–78 Colorado Rockies season was the fourth season of the franchise, and second as the Rockies. Despite winning only 19 games and finishing 21 games below .500, they finished runners-up in the weak Smythe Division and secured a playoff berth under the format in effect at the time. It was their first playoff appearance in franchise history, and the only one they would make while in Denver.

Offseason

Regular season

Final standings

Schedule and results

Playoffs

The Rockies played a best-of-three preliminary round series against the Philadelphia Flyers. The Flyers would sweep the series in two-straight games.

Player statistics

Regular season
Scoring

Goaltending

Playoffs
Scoring

Goaltending

Note: GP = Games played; G = Goals; A = Assists; Pts = Points; +/- = Plus/minus; PIM = Penalty minutes; PPG=Power-play goals; SHG=Short-handed goals; GWG=Game-winning goals
      MIN=Minutes played; W = Wins; L = Losses; T = Ties; GA = Goals against; GAA = Goals against average; SO = Shutouts;

Awards and records

Transactions

Draft picks
Colorado's draft picks at the 1977 NHL amateur draft held at the Mount Royal Hotel in Montreal, Quebec.

Farm teams

See also
 1977–78 NHL season

References

External links

Colorado Rockies (NHL) seasons
Colorado
Colorado
Colorado
Colorado